Ghulam Muhammad Qasir ( 4 September 1944 – 20 February 1999) was a Pakistani Urdu poet. He was considered to be one of the finest modern poets of Urdu Ghazal. Ahmad Nadeem Qasmi was the one who 1st introduced him in his famous literary journal called "Fanoon" back in year 1977. Ghulam Muhammad Qasir came up with his 1st collection of poetry called "Tasalsul" in the same year and received warm acceptance across the country. He was awarded with the Presidential Pride of Performance Award (Posthumous) by the Government of Pakistan in 2006–07, for his valuable contributions in the field of Urdu literature.

Ghulam Muhammad Qasir was born in Paharpur, Dera Ismail Khan, North-West Frontier Province (NWFP) now called khyber Pakhtunkhwa KPK, Pakistan, on 4 September 1944. He joined the Education Department as lecturer of Urdu and served different colleges across the province. He died on 20 February 1999 and is buried in Peshawar KPK, Pakistan.

Professional background

After finishing secondary school from Government High School Paharpur, he was appointed as a teacher in the same school. Qasir taught in many different schools adjacent to Dera Ismail Khan. While working as a teacher Qasir kept on improving his education. After completing his master's degree in Urdu literature, he was first appointed as a lecturer at Government College Mardan. He also worked at Science Superior College Peshawar, Government College Dara Adam Khel, Government College Peshawar, Government College Toru, and Government College Pabbi.

Literary contributions

Rang e Adbad Publications Karachi has published Ghulam Muhammad Qasir number in June 2022 
Sar e Shaakh e Yaqeen (Hamd , Na`at, Manqabat) 2020
Ik sher abhi tak rehta hai (Kuliyat-e-Qasir) (complete poetry) 2009 & 2018
Darya-e-Gumaan (an anthology of poetry) 1997
Aathwaan aasman bhi neela hai (an anthology of poetry) 1988
Tasalsul (an anthology of poetry) 1977
Qasir wrote many essays which were printed by leading literary journals and, besides, he wrote prefaces for some of the poetry anthologies

Research

 Qasir remained on the list of contributors to the Textbook Board of NWFP for classes 7th, 11th & 12th in the subject of Urdu in early 1990s.
 Since 1968 Qasir remained a regular contributor to all the leading literary national journals in the field of poetry, essays and literary criticism.

Laurels

 Pride of Performance award for Poetry by the Government of Pakistan 2006–07
 Parveen Shakir "Aks-e-Khushboo" award for best poetry (Daryaa-e-Gumaa`n) Parveen Shakir Trust, Islamabad 1998
 Golden Jubilee award-Peshawar University Teachers Association 1996–97
 Pakistan-Iran Friendship award, Khana-e-Farhang-e-Iran, Lahore 1996
 Mehfil-e-Sabza-o-Gul award, Pakistan Writers Guild 1996
 15th Anniversary of Great Islamic Revolution award- Khana-e-Farhang-e-Iran, Peshawar 1994
 Waseeqa-e-Aitraaf, Shaam-e-Hamdard, Hamdard Foundation Peshawar 1994
 Best Lyricist PTV Award, PTV Peshawar 1993
 Bolan award for best dramatist / poetry, Bolan academy 1993
 Sardar Abdur Rab Nishtar award (Gold Medal) for best poetry (Aathwaan aasmaan bhi neela hai) Abaseen Arts Council Peshawar 1988–89
 Presidential National Award (Seerat Conference) 1987

Tributes

 Ghulam Muhammad Qasir Academy was founded in Nawan Kali Toru (Mardan) by one of his students, Mr. Pir Zada,
 A Forum was founded by the name of "Tasalsul" in Peshawar, which brings out a literary journal.
 Qasir was founder and the first chairman of a literary society " Takhleeq, International" Peshawar.
 Qasir remained member of Pakistan Writers' guild and Abaseen Arts Council, Peshawar.
 All writings of Qasir enjoyed huge popularity especially among young people.
 Thousands of Qasir's students have greatly appreciated him and are working on several high posts throughout the country
 * Professor Dr. Sohail Ahmad has published his MPhil research thesis on "The life and works of Ghulam Muhammad Qasir" from the University of Peshawar.
 Since 1970 until his death (1999) he has regularly participated in all important national & religious functions and occasions on Radio Pakistan and Pakistan Television PTV Peshawar
 Qasir has written a large number of dramas and programmes for PTV, among which the most popular serials were Talash and Bhoot Bangla (Haunted Bungalow).
 Qasir has participated in many International Literary Symposia, Conferences, Mushairas in the United States, where he was highly appreciated. 
 Qasir participated in many literary conferences held under the auspices of "Halqa-e-Arbab-e-Zoq, New York.

Website
 www.qasir.com Through this website short introduction, photographs, selective poetry and details of awards can be found.

See also

Urdu poetry
List of Urdu poets
List of Pakistani writers

External links
Ghulam Muhammad Qasir

1944 births
1999 deaths
People from Dera Ismail Khan District
Pakistani poets
Urdu-language poets from Pakistan
Recipients of the Pride of Performance
20th-century poets
PTV Award winners